The Hawai'i Library Association (HLA) is a professional organization for Hawaii's librarians and library workers created "to promote library service and librarianship in Hawai'i." It is headquartered in Honolulu, Hawai'i. The Hawai'i Library Association was organized at a meeting of 20 county librarians on January 16–17, 1922. Clara Hemenway, director of the University of Hawai'i Library was the first president. The association's first informal meeting was in 1922; Margaret Newman was the first elected president at their first official meeting in 1924. HLA became a chapter of the American Library Association at that same meeting, in March 1924.

HLA publishes the HLA Newsletter (first published in 1943 as the News Bulletin), the Hawai‘i Library Association Journal (starting in 1944), and Current Hawaiiana.  HLA's Children and Youth Section sponsors the annual Nēnē Award, a children's book award selected by Hawaii's elementary and middle school children.

HLA sections
HLA has seven sections as of January, 2020.
 Administration Section
 Hawaiian Section
 Information Technology Section
 Reference and User Services Section
 School and Media Center Services Section
 Technical Services Section
 Children and Youth Services Section

References

External links
 Hawai'i Library Association website
 Pacific Islands Association of Libraries, Archives, and Museums website

hawaii
Organizations based in Hawaii
1922 establishments in Hawaii